Marcelo Rosa Moura Marques (born 28 May 1991), known as Marcelo Rosa, is a Brazilian footballer who plays for Villa Nova as a midfielder.

Club career
Born in Ponte Nova, Minas Gerais, Marcelo Rosa graduated with Villa Nova's youth setup, after appearing with clubs in his native state. He made his senior debuts in 2013, in that year's Campeonato Mineiro.

On 29 September 2013 Marcelo Rosa was loaned to América Mineiro until the end of 2014. He made his debut for the club on 16 November, coming on as a second-half substitute for Claudinei in a 3–0 home win against Atlético Goianiense for the Série B championship.

In July 2014 Marcelo Rosa returned to Villa, after appearing sparingly with América. On 11 May 2015 he was loaned to Portuguesa until the end of the year.

References

External links

1991 births
Living people
Sportspeople from Minas Gerais
Brazilian footballers
Association football midfielders
Campeonato Brasileiro Série B players
Campeonato Brasileiro Série C players
Campeonato Brasileiro Série D players
Villa Nova Atlético Clube players
América Futebol Clube (MG) players
Associação Portuguesa de Desportos players